Ocean Walk Shoppes is an open-air shopping mall located in Daytona Beach, Florida.

Major Retailers
Major retailers within the centre include:
 Satellite Cinemas Movies
 Wyndham Resorts
 Maui Nix Surf Shop
 Point Break
 Brik A Brak 
 Rocket Fizz

Major Restaurants
Major food retailers within the centre include:
 Bubba Gump Shrimp Company
 Cold Stone Creamery
 Pho 13
 Ker's WingHouse
 Johnny Rockets
 Sloppy Joe's
 Mai Tai Bar

Nearby Attractions
 Daytona Beach Boardwalk
 Ocean Center (Convention Center)
 Daytona Beach Bandshell
 Daytona Lagoon Waterpark
 Daytona Beach Boardwalk Amusements
 Daytona Beach Main Street Pier

References

External links

Ocean Walk Shoppes website
Morris Architects website

Buildings and structures in Daytona Beach, Florida
Shopping malls in Florida
Shopping malls established in 2001
Tourist attractions in Daytona Beach, Florida